Affonso Romano de Sant'Anna (born March 27, 1937), is a Brazilian poet, essay writer, and professor.

Background
He was a professor of Brazilian Literature at UCLA and the University of Texas at El Paso, and a writer for the O Globo newspaper. In 1971 he married Marina Colasanti, a Brazilian journalist and writer. In 1984, he began writing for Jornal do Brasil.

Works
 1962 – O Desemprego da Poesia
 1965 – Canto e Palavra (poem book)
 1980 – Que país é este?
 1986 – A Mulher Madura (book of articles for O Globo)

References

External links

 Releituras (Portuguese)

1937 births
University of California, Los Angeles faculty
University of Texas at El Paso faculty
Living people